The Department of Employment, Workplace Relations and Small Business was an Australian government department that existed between October 1998 and November 2001.

Scope
Information about the department's functions and/or government funding allocation could be found in the Administrative Arrangements Orders, the annual Portfolio Budget Statements, in the Department's annual reports and on the Department's website.

At its creation, the Department was responsible for the following:
Employment policy, including employment services 
Job Network 
Labour market programs, including the Work for the Dole scheme
Workplace relations policy development, advocacy and implementation 
Promotion of flexible workplace relations policies and practices 
Small business policy and implementation, including business entry point management 
Co-ordination of labour market research 
Australian government employment pay and conditions 
Occupational health and safety, rehabilitation and compensation 
Notification and assessment of industrial chemicals 
Affirmative action 
Work and family issues

Structure
The Department was an Australian Public Service department, staffed by officials who were responsible to the Minister for Employment, Workplace Relations and Small Business.

References

Ministries established in 1998
Employment, Workplace Relations and Small Business